International Market World is a very large flea market located just west of Auburndale, Florida, United States. The flea market is on the north side of U.S. Highway 92.  Just to its southwest is the intersection of US 92 and Polk Parkway (State Road 570). International Market World is open every Friday, Saturday and Sunday throughout the year and is the largest one in Polk County, Florida, and it is also one of the largest in central Florida.

This flea market has many vendors selling a variety of new and used items.  A number of food concessions offer a variety of foods to eat.  One large section is devoted to a number of produce vendors.  International Market World offers some entertainment.  At times musicians perform and there are sometimes alligator and other animal shows.  The Florida State Championship Bluegrass and Clogging Festival is always held at the flea market the third weekend in March.

References

Tourist attractions in Polk County, Florida
Buildings and structures in Polk County, Florida
Shopping malls in Florida
Shopping malls established in 1981
1981 establishments in Florida